Asthenotricha candace is a moth in the family Geometridae first described by Louis Beethoven Prout in 1929. It is found in Ethiopia.

References

Endemic fauna of Ethiopia
Moths described in 1929
Asthenotricha
Insects of Ethiopia
Moths of Africa